The 2018 World Cup of Pool was the twelfth edition of the tournament. The event took place in Luwan Gymnasium, Shanghai, China, from 15 to 20 May 2018.

Prize fund
Winners (per pair): $60,000
Runners-up (per pair): $30,000
Semi-finalists (per pair): $15,000
Quarter-finalists (per pair): $9,000	
Last 16 losers (per pair): $4,500
Last 32 losers (per pair): $3,625

Participating nations

Seeded teams:
 (Mario He & Albin Ouschan)
 A (Wu Jia-qing & Liu Haitao)
 (Chang Jung-Lin & Cheng Yu-hsuan)
 (Carlo Biado & Jeff de Luna)
 (Ralf Souquet & Joshua Filler)
 (Shane Van Boening & Skyler Woodward)
 (David Alcaide & Francisco Sánchez Ruíz)
 (Niels Feijen & Marc Bijsterbosch)
 (Jason Klatt & Alex Pagulayan)
 (Naoyuki Ōi & Tōru Kuribayashi)
 (Mika Immonen & Petri Makkonen)
 B (Dejing Kong & Ming Wang)
 (Imran Majid & Mark Gray)
 (Alexander Kazakis & Nick Malaj)
 (Ruslan Chinakhov & Fedor Gorst)
 (Mateusz Śniegocki & Wiktor Zieliński)

Unseeded teams:
 (Eklent Kaçi & Edmond Zaja)
 (Jayson Shaw & Scott Gillespie)
 (Christian Sparrenloev-Fischer & Tomas Larsen)
 (Ryu Seung-woo & Jeong Young-hwa)
 (Denis Grabe & Mark Mägi)
 (Arun & Feri Satriyadi)
 (Aloysius Yapp & Toh Lian Han)
 (Nitiwat Kanjanasri & Tanut Makkamontree)
 (Muhammad Almie & Darryl Chia)
 (Lo Ho Sum & Robbie Capito)
 (Matt Edwards & Marco Teutscher)
 (James Delahunty & Justin Sajich)
 (Alejandro Carvajal & Enrique Rojas)
 (Bader Al Awadhi & Mohammad Al Khashawi)
 (Dương Quốc Hoàng & Nguyễn Anh Tuấn)
 (Richard Halliday & Jacobus Le Roux)

Tournament bracket

References

2018
2018 in cue sports
2010s in Shanghai
2018 in Chinese sport
Sports competitions in Shanghai
May 2018 sports events in China
Cue sports in China